The consensus 1971 College Basketball All-American team, as determined by aggregating the results of four major All-American teams.  To earn "consensus" status, a player must win honors from a majority of the following teams: the Associated Press, the USBWA, The United Press International and the National Association of Basketball Coaches.

1971 Consensus All-America team

Individual All-America teams

AP Honorable Mention:

Henry Bibby, UCLA
Corky Calhoun, Pennsylvania
Jim Chones, Marquette
Jim Cleamons, Ohio State
Kresimir Cosic, Brigham Young
Charlie Davis, Wake Forest
Dwight Davis, Houston
Randy Denton, Duke
Ken Durrett, La Salle
Jimmy England, Tennessee
Julius Erving, Massachusetts
Jeff Halliburton, Drake
Willie Humes, Idaho State
Jim Irving, Saint Louis
Goo Kennedy, Texas Christian
Ken Kowall, Ohio
Dennis Layton, Southern California
Dana Lewis, Tulsa
Stan Love, Oregon
John Mengelt, Auburn
Tom Owens, South Carolina
Tom Payne, Kentucky
Gene Phillips, Southern Methodist
Jim Price, Louisville
Jackie Ridgle, California
Marv Roberts, Utah State
Al Sanders, Louisiana State
Willie Sojourner, Weber State
Marvin Stewart, Nebraska
Joe Sutter, Davidson
Claude Terry, Stanford
George Trapp, Long Beach State
Poo Welch, Houston
Henry Wilmore, Michigan
Dennis Wuycik, North Carolina
Charlie Yelverton, Fordham

See also
 1970–71 NCAA University Division men's basketball season

References

NCAA Men's Basketball All-Americans
All-Americans